Mano Dayak International Airport  is an airport in Agadez in Niger. It is named after Mano Dayak, a Tuareg leader.

Geography 
Agadez is in the Agadez region in North-East Niger.

Niger Airlines operates flights to Niamey, the country's capital. Air Libya provides flights to Tripoli in Libya.

Airlines and destinations

See also

Nigerien Air Base 201, a US drone base around 3 km to the south

References

External links 
 Agadez Airport at Bradshaw Foundation

Airports in Niger